Josef Ber is an Australian actor, director and writer, best known for his role as Sergeant Dominic Wales in the television series Rush.

Early life
Ber grew up in Sydney Australia. He went to school at Marayong Heights Public School, Lorien Novalis
and Baulkham Hills High School. He graduated from Australia's National Institute of Dramatic Art (NIDA) with a degree in Performing Arts (Acting) in 1997.

Career
Ber has appeared in many television series including McLeod's Daughters, Love My Way, Home and Away, The Surgeon, All Saints, Young Lions, Murder Call, Wildside and Water Rats. Ber is a NIDA graduate who has also had many roles in movies and theatre. Ber started out as a singer in his teens, performing at Australia's Wonderland. He then landed a role in the musical Grease for the Australian and New Zealand tours. Ber attended NIDA in the years 1995-1997 graduating with a Bachelor of Dramatic Art.

Filmography 
 TV Series.:

 Films.:

 Theatre.:

|-
2018 Mamma Mia! The Musical Australia 
Played Bill Austin

References

External links
 
 Josef Ber on TV.com
 Josef Ber - Rush: Cast
 National Institute of Dramatic Art "NIDA"
 Josef Ber

Australian male film actors
Australian male television actors
Living people
Year of birth missing (living people)